Chinyingi is a Capuchin mission and hospital in the sparsely populated North-Western Province of Zambia, on the west bank of the Zambezi River.  An estimated 6000 people live within a seven kilometer radius of the Chinyingi mission.  The mission's hospital, Chinyingi Mission Hospital, serves the local community with a 52-bed hospital and several health outreach programs, providing everything from first aid to services for people with HIV/AIDS AIDS, which affects some 25% of Zambia's population.  The mission also operates a school.

In the 1970s, a Capuchin brother named Crispin Valeri constructed a pedestrian bridge over the Zambezi River. Valeri was motivated by the deaths of five people who drowned in the Zambezi River as the tragic result of four people trying to use a dugout canoe to ferry a sick person to the hospital for care.  He solicited donations of material from the copper mines of Zambia's Copperbelt, and employed local unskilled labor to construct the bridge, which despite Valeri's lack of training or expertise, proved sturdy and reliable and still spans the river .  At the time, the bridge Valeri constructed was one of only five crossings along the 2,574 kilometer length of the Zambezi.  A pontoon bridge was later constructed underneath it to allow vehicles to cross.

Chinyingi's elevation above sea level is 1,100 meters.

Chinyingi Mission Hospital redesign 

As of May 2016, the Chinyingi Mission Hospital was undergoing renovations, with hospital staff consisting only of one nurse. The remainder of the staff had moved elsewhere, looking for employment at rural health outposts spread across the North-Western Province of Zambia or at the Zambezi District Hospital, located across the Zambezi River in the village of Zambezi. The priests of the Chinyingi Mission noted that the redesign and renovation of the hospital was a necessity, as they were unable to find a doctor that wished to practice at the facility. Instead of closing the doors to the hospital permanently, they initiated renovations in order to keep the facility up to high standards, and to provide medical care for the villagers on the western bank of the Zambezi River as Valeri intended by building the suspension bridge.

See also 
 List of crossings of the Zambezi River

References

McIntyre, Chris. "Chapter 17: The Western Provinces". Guide to Zambia (online edition). Bradt Travel Guides. 3rd edition: November 2004.
"A Life of Heartbreaking Beauty and Sadness" (2002). Capuchin Franciscan Friars Province of Stigmata of St. Francis. Retrieved August 10, 2005.
"Chinyingi, Zambia Page". Falling Rain Genomics, Inc. Retrieved August 10, 2005.

External links
 http://photography.nationalgeographic.com/photography/enlarge/zambezi-river-bridge_pod_image.html
 https://web.archive.org/web/20161031114933/http://www.panoramio.com/photo/110335782
Christian missions in Zambia
Populated places in North-Western Province, Zambia